David Allison (1873 – after 1901) was a French-born English footballer, who played as a striker.

Club career 
In 1899, Allison was one of the charter members of Italian club A.C. Milan, which was originally named Milan Foot-Ball and Cricket Club, and was selected as the first captain of the team. Allison is also credited as the first goalscorer in the history of the club, scoring the opening goal in Milan's first match, a friendly against Mediolanum, on 11 March 1900.

Honours

Club 
Milan F.B.C.C.
Campionato Federale: 1901

References

External links 
Profile at MagliaRossonera.it 

1873 births
English footballers
Association football forwards
A.C. Milan players
English expatriate footballers
English expatriate sportspeople in Italy
Expatriate footballers in Italy
Date of birth missing
Year of death missing
French emigrants to the United Kingdom